Escalivada, also sometimes transcribed in Spanish as escalibada, is a traditional dish from Catalonia, Valencia, Murcia and Aragón of smoky grilled vegetables. It typically consists of roasted eggplant and bell peppers with olive oil and sometimes onion, tomato, minced garlic, and salt.

The name comes from the Catalan verb , "to cook in ashes", referencing the dish's traditional preparation in the embers of a wood fire.

The dish can be grilled outdoors on a grate until charred and soft or may be cooked whole directly on glowing coals and then peeled. Indoors, the eggplant may be charred on a gas burner and the rest of the vegetables may be broiled.

The dish may be served as tapas, as a relish for grilled meats or fish such as tuna, with anchovies or olives in a salad, or as a topping for coca (Catalan flat bread, somewhat similar to a pizza).

References

Eggplant dishes
Catalan cuisine
Tapas